Maria Auxiliadora Seabra Rezende (born 1 October 1964) better known as Dorinha Rezende or Professora Dorinha is a Brazilian politician and university professor. Although born in Goiás, she has spent her political career representing Tocantins, having served as federal deputy representative since 2011.

Personal life
Rezende was born to Antônio dos Santos Seabra and Maria Consuêlo Bastos. In addition to being a politician, Rezende is also a university professor.

Political career
Rezende voted in favor of the impeachment of then-president Dilma Rousseff. Rezende voted against the 2015 tax reforms but in favor of the 2017 Brazilian labor reform, and would vote against the opening of a corruption investigation into Rousseff's successor Michel Temer.

References 

1964 births
Living people
People from Goiânia
Brazilian educators
Democrats (Brazil) politicians
Members of the Chamber of Deputies (Brazil) from Tocantins
Brazilian women in politics

Brazil Union politicians